The 1979 Ulster Unionist Party leadership election saw James Molyneaux succeed Harry West as leader on 7 September. At a specially convened meeting of the Ulster Unionist Council at the Ulster Hall, Belfast, in early September, Molyneaux (MP for South Antrim) beat Reverend Robert Bradford (MP for Belfast South) by a three to one majority (with Austin Ardill coming a distant third). Molyneaux had previously been parliamentary leader of the United Ulster Unionist Council since 22 October 1974 (West had lost his seat in that month's general election).

Notes

Ulster Unionist Party leadership elections
1979 elections in the United Kingdom
1979 elections in Northern Ireland
Ulster Unionist Party leadership election